Statistics of Kuwaiti Premier League for the 1997–98 season.

Overview
It was contested by 14 teams, and Al Salmiya Club won the championship.

League standings

References
Kuwait - List of final tables (RSSSF)
RSSSF 

1997–98
1
1997–98 in Asian association football leagues